Beylikdüzü Belediye is a station on the Istanbul Metrobus Bus rapid transit line. It is located on the D.100 state highway, with the entrance/exit located on Özgürlük Square. The Beylikdüzü Municipality building, from which the station has its name, is located on the south side of the square.

Beylikdüzü Belediye station was opened on 19 July 2012 as part of the westward expansion of the line.

References

External links
Beylikdüzü Belediye station
Beylikdüzü Belediye in Google Street View

Istanbul Metrobus stations
2012 establishments in Turkey
Beylikdüzü